The 2016 Canad Inns Women's Classic was held from October 21 to 24 at the Portage Curling Club in Portage la Prairie, Manitoba as part of the World Curling Tour. The event was held in a triple-knockout format with a purse of $60,000.

In the final, Team Rachel Homan of Ottawa, Ontario topped Team Chiaki Matsumura of Japan 9–4 in six ends. Homan lost their first game of the event to China's Mei Jie before winning their next eight games to claim the championship.

Teams
The teams are listed as follows:

Knockout brackets

Source:

A event

B event

C event

Knockout results
All draw times listed in Central Time (UTC−06:00).

Draw 1
Friday, October 21, 10:00 am

Draw 2
Friday, October 21, 1:30 pm

Draw 3
Friday, October 21, 5:00 pm

Draw 4
Friday, October 21, 8:30 pm

Draw 5
Saturday, October 22, 10:00 am

Draw 6
Saturday, October 22, 1:30 pm

Draw 7
Saturday, October 22, 5:00 pm

Draw 8
Saturday, October 22, 8:30 pm

Draw 9
Sunday, October 23, 10:00 am

Draw 10
Sunday, October 23, 1:30 pm

Draw 11
Sunday, October 23, 5:00 pm

Draw 12
Sunday, October 23, 8:30 pm

Playoffs

Source:

Quarterfinals
Monday, October 24, 10:00 am

Semifinals
Monday, October 24, 2:00 pm

Final
Monday, October 24, 6:00 pm

References

External links
CurlingZone

2016 in Canadian curling
2016 in Manitoba
October 2016 sports events in Canada
2016 in women's curling
Sport in Portage la Prairie